Jorge Luis Velandia Macías  (born January 12, 1975) is a former Major League Baseball shortstop.

Playing career
Velandia played with the San Diego Padres (1997), Oakland Athletics (1998–2000), New York Mets (2000–2003), Tampa Bay Devil Rays (2007), Toronto Blue Jays (2008), and Cleveland Indians (2008). On December 1, 2006, the Devil Rays signed Velandia to a minor league deal with an invitation to spring training. His first major league home run, which was a grand slam, came on September 25, 2007. 

In December 2007, Velandia signed a minor league contract with the Pittsburgh Pirates. He was released by the Pirates on March 29, 2008, and signed with the Toronto Blue Jays two days later. Velandia started the 2008 season playing for the Syracuse Chiefs, the Triple-A affiliate of the Blue Jays. On May 7, his contract was purchased by the Blue Jays, and was added to the active roster. On May 16, he was designated for assignment and declined an outright assignment on May 19, becoming a free agent. Velandia signed with the Cleveland Indians on May 26, 2008, and was assigned to their Triple-A affiliate, the Buffalo Bisons.

He was called up on June 12, to replace the injured Josh Barfield (who had been recently called up himself, for Asdrúbal Cabrera). Cabrera returned a month later, and Velandia was sent back to Buffalo. He was traded to the Tampa Bay Rays on August 31. On January 22, 2009, Velandia signed a minor league contract with the Philadelphia Phillies.

Velandia was the captain of Tiburones de La Guaira in the Venezuelan Winter League until his retirement of active duty in January 2010.

Coaching career
After working for the Philadelphia Phillies as assistant minor league field coordinator, he was announced as an assistant coach for the Phillies upon former manager Ryne Sandberg's resignation on June 26, 2015.

Front office career 
On December 22, 2020, the Phillies named Velandia as the team's assistant general manager under Sam Fuld.

See also

 List of Major League Baseball players from Venezuela

References

Sources
The ESPN Baseball Encyclopedia – Gary Gillette, Peter Gammons, Pete Palmer. Publisher: Sterling Publishing, 2005. Format: Paperback, 1824pp. Language: English. 
 ESPN (profile and daily update)
 Baseball Cube baseball statistics

External links
, or Pura Pelota, or Retrosheet

1975 births
Living people
Águilas del Zulia players
Bristol Tigers players
Buffalo Bisons (minor league) players
Charlotte Knights players
Cleveland Indians players
Durham Bulls players
Edmonton Trappers players
Fayetteville Generals players
Indianapolis Indians players
Lakeland Tigers players
Las Vegas Stars (baseball) players
Lehigh Valley IronPigs players
Major League Baseball infielders
Major League Baseball players from Venezuela
Memphis Chicks players
Minor league baseball coaches
Minor league baseball executives
Niagara Falls Rapids players
New York Mets players
Norfolk Tides players
Oakland Athletics players
Richmond Braves players
Sacramento River Cats players
San Diego Padres players
Baseball players from Caracas
Springfield Sultans players
Syracuse Chiefs players
Tampa Bay Devil Rays players
Tiburones de La Guaira players
Toronto Blue Jays players
Venezuelan baseball coaches
Venezuelan expatriate baseball players in Canada
Venezuelan expatriate baseball players in the United States